The Java Transaction Service (JTS) is a specification for building a transaction manager that maps onto the Object Management Group (OMG) Object Transaction Service (OTS) used in the Common Object Request Broker Architecture (CORBA) architecture. It uses General Inter-ORB Protocol (IIOP) to propagate the transactions between multiple JTS transaction managers.

Additional resources 
 Sun's JTS description. 

Transaction service